Starr FM is a privately owned urban, lifestyle radio station, which focuses on the delivery of compelling programmes through good music, entertainment/lifestyle-led talk programmes and sports for its target audience and a member of the Excellence In Broadcasting (EIB Network). The radio station is in Accra, the capital of Ghana. The station is owned by former Ghana Finance Minister Kwabena Duffuor.

References 

Radio stations in Ghana
Greater Accra Region
Mass media in Accra